Paphiopedilum lowii is a species of orchid that occurs in Indonesia, Malaysia, and the Philippines.

External links

lowii